Rechlin–Lärz Airfield  (German: Flugplatz Rechlin-Lärz) is an airfield in the village of Rechlin, Mecklenburg-Western Pomerania, Germany. The airport is not used for scheduled traffic but features general aviation and is home to other leisure activities as well. Additionally, the music festival Fusion Festival takes place here.

History

The airport was once part of the Third Reich era's Luftwaffe main testing ground, or Erprobungsstelle for new aircraft designs, the heart of which was actually centered on two large turf areas some  due north (at ) of the 21st century era paved-runway airport facility. The Rechlin data sheets on Luftwaffe and captured Allied aircraft are considered by many aviation historians to be among the most reliable sources for aircraft performance data from the World War II era. Its role was taken over after 1945 by the Bundeswehr military aviation installation at Manching, within West German borders, since Rechlin was well inside the borders of East Germany for 45 years.

Construction of the first airfield at Rechlin started in 1916; the airfield was officially opened on 29 August 1918 under the governance of the German Empire. After the end of World War I, the airfield was closed again and many of its installations dismantled. During the 1920s, the airfield was reopened as a civilian airbase, but it was soon used as a testing ground for the secret German air force experiments under the Treaty of Rapallo. The site was probably chosen for its remote location in an almost uninhabited area.

On February 26, 1936, per order of Wehrmacht Generalfeldmarschall Werner von Blomberg, the Rechlin airfield became the official testing ground of the newly formed Luftwaffe. The turf-surfaced site, still bounded by the aforementioned hexagonal-layout ring road around its perimeter, was designated as the central Erprobungsstelle (E-Stelle) test facility of the Luftwaffe, and was expanded by constructing two more airfields: a second, smaller turf-surfaced field just east of the main site in nearby Roggentin and just south of the main site at Lärz, the latter of which became the modern 21st century airfield site. Construction work on the airfields and the accompanying barracks was partly carried out by forced labor from nearby concentration camp Ravensbrück.

Many of the Luftwaffe's new combat aircraft prototypes were test flown at the main turf-fielded Rechlin facilities; the special operations combat wing of the Luftwaffe, KG 200, with its array of captured planes was a regular guest at the airfields. After several Allied bombing runs on the primary turf-surfaced aerodrome field of Rechlin, and the satellite Roggentin airfield in 1944, testing of late-war planes was shifted just southwards to Lärz. On April 10, 1945, a final bomber attack by the US Army Air Forces – amounting to 11 B-17s and 159 B-24s from the 8th Air Force which was targeting airfields used by German jet fighters – almost completely destroyed the airfields; what was left was blown up by the German garrison before Soviet troops arrived at Rechlin on May 2.

In 1946, the Soviet Air Force established a permanent presence at the airbase. The 19th Guards fighter-bomber regiment of the 16th Air Army and a helicopter squadron were stationed at Lärz; the airfield at Rechlin was used by the National People's Army (NVA). Military usage of the airfields continued until 1993, when the last Russian air force units were moved home. The Rechlin airfield was reopened for civilian use in 1994.

See also
 German language Wikipedia page for the Erprobungsstelle Rechlin test facility
 Erprobungsstelle Tarnewitz, one of the coastal Erprobungsstellen on the Baltic Sea under control from the Rechlin HQ facility
 Luftfahrtforschungsanstalt, the largest (and most secretive) aviation research facility of the Third Reich (1935–45) near Völkenrode, but without an airfield of its own. 
 Transport in Germany
 List of airports in Germany
 Edgar Petersen, the World War II Luftwaffe colonel (Oberst) who commanded both the Rechlin facility, and was the "KdE" (Kommandeur der Erprobungstellen), or commander for the entire Luftwaffe test department late in the war. 
 Hanna Reitsch
 Oslo Report, which divulged the Erprobungstelle facility very early in the war to the British

References

External links

 Official website
 Website of the aviation museum in Rechlin
 Website of the cultural organization Kulturkosmos located at Rechlin–Lärz Airfield (Fusion Festival organisers)
 
 
 RonaldV's "Abandoned, Forgotten & Little-Known Airfields in Europe" listing

Aviation research institutes
Former Soviet military air bases in East Germany
Luftwaffe bases
Airports in Mecklenburg-Western Pomerania